Earl Irvin West (May 18, 1920, Carmel, Indiana – February 4, 2011, Memphis, Tennessee) was a historian of the Restoration Movement. He was known for his multivolume work Search for the Ancient Order, published incrementally from 1949 to 1993. He was baptized by Hugo McCord in 1935. A graduate of Butler University, he received his Ph.D in American History at Indiana University. Although he lived in Indianapolis, Indiana, and was the minister for two different congregations, he also served for many years as professor of church history at Harding Graduate School of Religion in Memphis, Tennessee, now Harding School of Theology, commuting once a week to Memphis.  West founded Religious Book Service.

Notes 

1920 births
2011 deaths
American members of the Churches of Christ
Butler University alumni
Historians of Christianity
People from Carmel, Indiana
People from Memphis, Tennessee
Restoration Movement
American historians of religion